František Maxa (13 February 1923 – 16 September 2021) was a Czech sport shooter who competed in the 1952 Summer Olympics and in the 1956 Summer Olympics. He died in September 2021, at the age of 98.

References

1923 births
2021 deaths
Czech male sport shooters
Olympic shooters of Czechoslovakia
Shooters at the 1952 Summer Olympics
Shooters at the 1956 Summer Olympics
People from Prague-West District
Sportspeople from the Central Bohemian Region